Lachlan Wales (born 19 October 1997) is an Australian professional footballer who plays as a forward for Western United in the A-League.

Club career

Central Coast Mariners
Wales progressed from the youth ranks of the Central Coast Mariners to make his professional debut on 14 April 2017, replacing Fábio Ferreira in the 86th minute as they were beaten 1-0 by Melbourne Victory at AAMI Park.

Wales made a further 10 appearances for the Mariners in their 2017–18 campaign, notching two assists from seven starts as they went on to finish in 10th place.

Melbourne City
On 25 June 2018, Wales signed a two-year contract with Melbourne City. He made his debut for the club in a 2–1 win over Melbourne Victory in the Melbourne Derby, playing 85 minutes before being replaced by Anthony Lesiotis. Wales scored his first professional goal against Newcastle Jets on 2 December 2018, scoring City's third as they ran out 3-0 winners.

Wales left Melbourne City at the end of the 2019–20 A-League.

Western United
On 2 October 2020, Western United announced the signing of Wales on a two-year deal.

International career
In November 2019 he was one of four players suspended by the Australia national under-23 soccer team due to "unprofessional conduct". The four players allegedly mistreated a woman after an intimate encounter.

Wales qualified for the Tokyo 2020 Olympics. He was part of the Olyroos Olympic squad. The team beat Argentine in their first group match but were unable to win another match. They were therefore not in medal contention.

Career statistics

Club

Notes

References

External links

1997 births
Living people
Association football midfielders
Australian soccer players
Central Coast Mariners FC players
Melbourne City FC players
Western United FC players
A-League Men players
National Premier Leagues players
Footballers at the 2020 Summer Olympics
Olympic soccer players of Australia
People from the Central Coast (New South Wales)
Sportsmen from New South Wales
Soccer players from New South Wales